Marius Postolache (born 11 February 1984 in Timișoara) is a Romanian football player who played as a midfielder.

External links

 
 UEFA profile

1984 births
Living people
Sportspeople from Timișoara
Romanian footballers
Association football midfielders
CS Unirea Sânnicolau Mare players
FC Sportul Studențesc București players
FC Politehnica Timișoara players
FC Delta Dobrogea Tulcea players
CSU Voința Sibiu players
Liga I players